The County of Moira is one of the 37 counties of Victoria which are part of the cadastral divisions of Australia, used for land titles. It is located to the east of the Goulburn River, south of the Murray River, and west of part of the Ovens River. Part of Wangaratta is in the county, on the eastern end of it. It also includes Shepparton. The Shire of Moira is in a similar area.

Parishes 
Parishes within the county:
 Arcadia, Victoria
 Avenel, Victoria
 Balmattum, Victoria
 Barmah, Victoria
 Barwo, Victoria
 Baulkamaugh, Victoria
 Benalla, Victoria
 Boomahnoomoonah, Victoria
 Boosey, Victoria
 Boweya, Victoria
 Branjee, Victoria
 Bundalong, Victoria
 Bunganail, Victoria
 Bungeet, Victoria
 Burramine, Victoria
 Caniambo, Victoria
 Cobram, Victoria
 Cocomah, Victoria
 Congupna, Victoria
 Currawa, Victoria
 Dargalong, Victoria
 Devenish, Victoria
 Dookie, Victoria
 Drumanure, Victoria
 Dunbulbalane, Victoria
 Euroa, Victoria
 Glenrowen, Victoria
 Goomalibee, Victoria
 Goorambat, Victoria
 Gowangardie, Victoria
 Kaarimba, Victoria
 Karrabumet, Victoria
 Karramomus, Victoria
 Katamatite, Victoria
 Katandra, Victoria
 Katunga, Victoria
 Kialla, Victoria
 Killawarra, Victoria
 Kotupna, Victoria
 Longwood, Victoria
 Miepoll, Victoria
 Moglonemby, Victoria
 Moira, Victoria
 Mokoan, Victoria
 Molka, Victoria
 Monea North, Victoria
 Mundoona, Victoria
 Naringaningalook, Victoria
 Narioka, Victoria
 Peechelba, Victoria
 Pelluebla, Victoria
 Picola, Victoria
 Pine Lodge, Victoria
 Pranjip, Victoria
 Shadforth, Victoria
 Shepparton, Victoria
 St James, Victoria
 Stewarton, Victoria
 Strathmerton, Victoria
 Tabilk, Victoria
 Tallygaroopna, Victoria
 Taminick, Victoria
 Tamleugh, Victoria
 Tharanbegga, Victoria
 Ulupna, Victoria
 Upotipotpon, Victoria
 Waaia, Victoria
 Waggarandall, Victoria
 Wahring, Victoria
 Wangaratta South, Victoria
 Warrenbayne, Victoria
 Wills, Victoria
 Winton, Victoria
 Wormangal, Victoria
 Yabba Yabba, Victoria
 Yalca, Victoria
 Yarrawonga, Victoria
 Yarroweyah, Victoria
 Yielima, Victoria
 Youanmite, Victoria
 Youarang, Victoria

References
Vicnames, place name details
Research aids, Victoria 1910

Counties of Victoria (Australia)